In Indonesia, village or subdistrict is the fourth-level subdivision and the smallest administrative division of Indonesia below a district, regency/city, and province. There are a number of names and types for villages in Indonesia, with desa (rural village) being the most frequently used for regencies and kelurahan (urban village) for cities. According to the 2019 report by the Ministry of Home Affairs, there are 8,488 urban villages and 74,953 rural villages in Indonesia. North Aceh Regency contained the highest number of rural villages (852) amongst all of the regencies of Indonesia, followed by Pidie Regency with 730 rural villages and Bireuen Regency with 609 rural villages. Prabumulih, with only 12 rural villages, contained the fewest. Counted together, the sixteen regencies of Indonesia containing the most rural villages—namely, North Aceh (852), Pidie (730), Bireuen (609), Aceh Besar (604), Tolikara (541), East Aceh (513), Yahukimo (510), Purworejo (469), Lamongan (462), South Nias (459), Kebumen (449), Garut (421), Bojonegoro (419), Bogor (416), Cirebon (412), and Pati (401)—contain one-third of all the rural villages in Indonesia. Five of these are located in Aceh, two in Highland Papua, three in Central Java, two in East Java, three in West Java, and one in North Sumatra. An average number of rural villages in the regencies of Indonesia is 234 villages.

Number of rural villages in districts of Indonesia is usually varying from 40 to 50 villages. However, there are 9 districts in Indonesia with more than 60 rural villages or its variation, including:
 Abenaho (107 kampungs)
 Dolok (85 rural villages)
 Padang Bolak (77 rural villages)
 Lhoksukon (75 gampongs)
 Peusangan (69 gampongs)
 Krayan (65 rural villages)
 Padang Tiji, Pidie (each with 64 gampongs respectively)
 Welarek (61 kampungs)
The total number of villages in these 9 districts is 667, about 0.9% percent of 74,953 rural villages in Indonesia.

Types of villages

Kelurahan

Kelurahan is an urban village terminology primarily used in cities, but also tiny parts of regencies. It is commonly translated to English as subdistrict. The leader of kelurahan is called lurah. A lurah is a civil servant appointed by the district head. According to the Regulation of the Minister of Home Affairs Number 31 of 2006, a kelurahan can be created with the following criteria:
Java and Bali: having at least 4,500 residents or 900 families within an area of at least 3 km2.
Sumatra and Sulawesi: having at least 2,000 residents or 400 families within an area of at least 5 km2.
Kalimantan, West Nusa Tenggara, East Nusa Tenggara, Maluku, and Papua: having at least 900 residents or 180 families within an area of at least 7 km2.

A kelurahan must have a government office, an established transportation network, adequate communication facilities, and public facilities. If it no longer meets the above conditions it can be abolished or combined with other kelurahans based on the results of research and studies conducted by the city/regency government.

Desa

Desa is a rural village terminology used in the majority of regencies in Indonesia. However, several provinces have adopted their own terminology for their traditional villages (desa adat). The leader of a desa does not have a civil servant status and is chosen by the public through an election. According to the Law Number 6 of 2014, desa and desa adat are legal community units that have territorial boundaries that are authorized to regulate and administer government affairs, community interests based on community initiatives, original rights, and/or traditional rights recognized and respected in the government system of the Republic of Indonesia.

Variations of desa terminology in Indonesia include:
 Gampong in Aceh
 Nagari in West Sumatra (except Mentawai Islands Regency)
 Dusun in Bungo Regency (Jambi)
 Nagori in Simalungun Regency (North Sumatra)
 Kampung in some places in Indonesia:
 Lampung (in Central Lampung, Tulang Bawang, Way Kanan, and West Tulangbawang regencies)
 East Kalimantan (in Berau and West Kutai regencies)
 Provinces in Western New Guinea
 Pekon in Pringsewu, Tanggamus, and West Lampung regencies (Lampung)
 Tiyuh in West Tulang Bawang Regency (Lampung)
 In Bali, there are two forms of desa, i.e. desa dinas (service village) and desa adat (cultural village). Desa dinas deals with administrative functions, while desa adat deals with religious and cultural functions.
 Lembang in Tana Toraja and North Toraja regencies (South Sulawesi)
 Kalurahan in Special Region of Yogyakarta.

Number of villages

See also
Village-owned enterprise (Indonesian: Badan Usaha Milik Desa), a type of company that is managed and established by an Indonesian village

Notes
 In other places, "dusun" is an administrative division form below "desa".
 In other places, "kampung" is equal with "dusun", except in Bungo, Jambi.

References

Indonesia
Villages
Villages